Trygve Bergeid (born 30 March 1942) is a Norwegian ice hockey player. He was born in Oslo, Nazi Germany (Occupied Norway) and represented the club Isbjørnene. He played for the Norwegian national ice hockey team, and  participated at the Winter Olympics in Grenoble in 1968, where the Norwegian team placed 11th.

References

External links

1942 births
Living people
Ice hockey players at the 1968 Winter Olympics
Norwegian ice hockey players
Olympic ice hockey players of Norway
Ice hockey people from Oslo